The Compagnie des Carabiniers du Prince (in Monegasque: Cumpagnia d’i Carrabiniei d’u Pri̍ncipu, Prince's Company of Riflemen in English) is the Infantry branch of the Force Publique, and one of the limited number of militaries that recruits foreigners. Although Monaco's defence is the responsibility of France, Monaco maintains a small force for the protection of the Sovereign and the Prince's Palace. Formed by Prince Honoré IV in 1817, the unit was re-organized in 1909. The company numbers 124 officers and men. Whilst the NCOs and soldiers are local, the officers have served in the French Army or the Republican Guard. Along with the Corps des Sapeurs-Pompiers, the Carabiniers form Monaco's total public forces.

History

An antecedent of the Carabiniers was the company known in the 19th century as the "Papalins", former soldiers of the Papal States, who, upon the destitution of the Papacy's temporal authority at the time of the Italian Unification, were given the role of protecting the Sovereign and the Princely Family. A road in Fontvieille is named in honour of them.

In Monaco, the Milice Nationale was created in 1865. In 1870, the Milice Nationale was renamed the Gardes du Prince, although, the "Gardes" were still tasked with fire-fighting, and national security. On 5 May 1881 the Gardes du Prince were renamed the Compagnie de Sapeurs-Pompiers to better adjust to their fire-fighting duties. On 17 June 1909 the fire-fighting unit was re-organised into a separate operating company called the Compagnie de Sapeurs-Pompiers, while the protection unit was renamed the Corps des Carabiniers du Prince. This lasted over 60 years, until the companies were finally renamed the Corps des Sapeurs-Pompiers, and the Compagnie des Carabiniers du Prince, and were placed under the Force Publique's direct control.

The Carabiniers are currently commanded by Comdt. Martial Pied, who was sworn in on 2 January 2022. Previous commanders include, Lt. Col. Gilles Convertini (2017-2022), Lt. Col. Philippe Rebaudengo (2007-2017), Lt. Col. Jacques Morandon (2005-2007), Lt. Col. Luc Fringant (1993-2005), and Comdt. Maurice Allent (1978-1993).

Organisation and expenditures

Composed of 119 personnel of Francophone nationality (3 officers, 19 non-commissioned officers, and 97 men of rank), the Carabiniers are split into the following divisions:

 Band;
 Diving Team;
 Motorcycle Platoon;
 Bodyguard Unit;
 Palace Guard;
 Honour Guard;
 Civil Defence.

The 2012-2013 starting salary for a Carabinier is €2,200 ($2,908) a month or €26,400 ($34,893) a year. While the Company's 2012-2013 budget is €6.7 million ($8.8 million) per year.

Duties and missions

Since its inception, the Carabiniers were tasked with guarding the Prince's Palace, ensuring the security of the Sovereign and the Princely Family, to provide services to honour, and to assist law enforcement in times of need. The Palace is guarded at all times, twenty-four hours a day, with two non-commissioned officers of varying rank, one Maréchal des logis, and eight Carabiniers. The Changing of the Guard, is performed daily at 11.55 am, and announced by a musical element (two drums, two trumpets).

The Carabiniers provides services of honour. To "requisition", the Company escorts judiciary, participates in official ceremonies, civil and religious, and ceremonial parades and processions.

The Carabiniers also perform various missions of public service. With the creation of a Military Aid Unit, the Carabiniers implement ambulances for the Monegasque Red Cross. The Company participate as such, the security of major sporting events or arts that take place in the Principality, requiring emergency supplies and evacuation. The Company participate as appropriate in the implementation of emergency plan, ORMOS Red Plan (Monaco relief organisation), which also includes the Corps des Sapeurs-Pompiers, and the Direction de la Sûreté Publique.

The Diving Team is regularly asked to integrate with security devices, and participate in various rescue missions during the sailing competitions in Monegasque waters. They also participate in scientific observations, underwater environment for the study of pollution in the Mediterranean.

A Motorcycle Platoon is responsible for the Prince on his daily schedule, and escorting sovereign heads of state visiting Monaco.

The Band

The Carabiniers maintain a musical band consisting of twenty-six "rifle-musicians" under the command of a Maréchal des Logis Chef. In 1978, the title of "Fanfare de la Companies des Carabiniers" was adopted. An integral part of the unit, the band is not trained solely to perform music. Instead, Carabiniers receive the same training as their comrades. The band participates in the same occasions, and duties as the Company. The diversity of the repertoire of the band allows it to perform at official ceremonies, sporting events, and public concerts. Since 1989, the band has performed outside of Monaco, in multitudes of destinations, such as: Saumur, Nîmes, Albertville, Lugano, Düsseldorf, Turin, Lisbon, Seville, Geneva, and Hanover.

Equipment

The equipment and vehicles of the Carabiniers have been upgraded in recent years. Mobility has been improved by the adoption of modern vehicles, adapted to different missions, such as two MOWAG Piranha Vs, six Peugeot P4s, and seven BMW R1200RT-Ps.

Old rifles and revolvers have been replaced by firearms such as the M16A2, and Glock 17.

Uniforms
Parade dress in the winter is a modernised version of that worn in the early 1900s. It comprises a dark blue tunic, and light blue trousers with red facings. A medium-blue cloth helmet is worn, with plumes for gala occasions. White trefoil epaulettes, spats and aiguillettes date from the 19th century.

In the summer a simple white shirt sleeve order is worn with a white helmet. For ordinary duties a modern police style uniform is worn with a peaked cap replacing the helmet.

Vehicles

Current

Former

Weapons

Current

Former

Recruitment

Carabiniers are recruited from among candidates who meet the following conditions:

Male;
Between nineteen and twenty-seven-years-old;
Single (marriage licence granted after the confirmation period);
Francophone;
Pass a vision examination;
Within a minimum height of 1.8 m to a maximum height of 2 m;
Body mass index less than or equal to twenty-five;
Pass a physical fitness test and examination;
Graduated with a high school or equivalent degree;
Possess a driving licence;
Capable of swimming.

Applicants may be esteemed if they know skills in one or more specialties relevant to the carabiniers. For instance: music (primarily band instruments), diving, first aid, culinary, computer, mechanics training, or combat experience.

Career development

At the time of his enlistment, a Carabinier signs his first contract for five years which is validated after a period of instruction, and confirmation period in which ability and motivation are verified. This confirmation is usually after one year's service, but may be extended for one or even two years further probation. A Carabinier can pursue his career and commitments by successive reenlistments after each five years of service until reaching age 55, subjecting to meet all the conditions of fitness. Promotion on merit allows a number of Carabiniers to reach the various grades of noncommissioned officers. However, a very low turnover rate of enlistments means that 50% finish their military career as a Carabinier first or second class.

Rank insignia

Popular culture
Jérémie Covillault, portrays a Carabinier in Grace of Monaco.

Notes

See also
Daniel Ducruet (former Carabinier)
Théophile Bellando de Castro (former Carabinier)
Force Publique
Corps des Sapeurs-Pompiers
Monaco

References

External links
 Compagnie des Carabiniers du Prince - Gouvernement Princier
 La Compagnie des Carabiniers de S.A.S. le Prince - Palais Princier

Military of Monaco
Military units and formations established in 1817
Guards regiments
Gendarmerie
Guards of honour

lt:Monako karinės pajėgos